Rhoda Marie Janzen Burton née Rhoda Marie Janzen is an American poet, academic and memoirist, best known for her memoir Mennonite in a Little Black Dress which was a finalist for a Thurber Prize for American Humor in 2010.

Early life and education
Janzen grew up in a Mennonite household in North Dakota as the daughter of a Mennonite pastor. 
In 1984 she graduated from Fresno Pacific University with a bachelors in English literature. Following this she earned a Masters of Fine Arts in creative writing from the University of Florida in Gainesville, Florida. 
She went on to earn an MA and a PhD from UCLA where she wrote her dissertation on American-British author Henry James. She currently teaches at Hope College in Holland, Michigan.

Memoirs
In 2006, Janzen's husband of 15 years left her for a man and a few days later she suffered serious injuries in a car accident. While on sabbatical from her teaching position, she went home to her Mennonite family in Fresno, California, to heal from these crises. These experiences are recounted in her memoir Mennonite in a Little Black Dress.

Her second memoir, Mennonite Meets Mr. Right, tells the story of her experiences surviving breast cancer, becoming a stepmom, and attending her new husband's Pentecostal church.

In addition to her memoir, Janzen is the author of Babel's Stair, a collection of poetry.

Critical reception
Janzen's first memoir, Mennonite in a Little Black Dress, has received acclaim for its comedic elements and was a finalist for the Thurber Prize for American Humor. The response from the Mennonite community, which it satirizes, has been mixed.

Mennonite poet and scholar Di Brandt found the memoir enjoyable and humorous but criticized the tone as "consistently  flippant, breezy, and almost relentlessly 'upbeat,'" for a book about what in Brandt's opinions is about the very serious topics of self-identity and midlife crisis.

In 2015, a Goshen College professor, Ervin Beck, listed Mennonite in a Little Black Dress among what he labeled with Peace Shall Destroy Many and others as the "canon of seven literary works by Mennonite authors writing about Mennonites have been regarded by many Mennonite readers as offensive."   Beck claimed that these works were dismissed by some critics as "transgressive" or purposefully shocking to gain popularity, but that this "transgressive canon" still serves as an important work within the wider Mennonite literature movement.

Bibliography
 Babel's Stair, Word Press, 2006
 Mennonite in a Little Black Dress, Henry Holt and Co., 2009
 Mennonite Meets Mr. Right, 2012

References

External links
 Official website

Living people
21st-century American poets
21st-century American memoirists
American Mennonites
Hope College faculty
Mennonite writers
Mennonite humorists
University of California, Los Angeles alumni
Writers from North Dakota
American women poets
American women memoirists
21st-century American women writers
1963 births